Joshua Noel Laban (born December 25, 1982) is an Olympic swimmer from the U.S. Virgin Islands. He was the USVI's flagbearer for the 2008 Olympics and the 2007 Pan American Games.  He attended college and swam at the University of Miami in Coral Gables, Florida, and University of Georgia in Athens, Georgia.

See also

 List of University of Georgia people

International tournaments
2008 Olympics,
2007 Pan American Games,
2007 World Championships,
2006 Central American and Caribbean Games, and
2004 Olympics.
2003 Pan American Games
1999 Pan American Games

References

1982 births
Living people
United States Virgin Islands male freestyle swimmers
Olympic swimmers of the United States Virgin Islands
Swimmers at the 1999 Pan American Games
Swimmers at the 2003 Pan American Games
Swimmers at the 2007 Pan American Games
Swimmers at the 2004 Summer Olympics
Swimmers at the 2008 Summer Olympics
Georgia Bulldogs men's swimmers
Pan American Games competitors for the United States Virgin Islands
People from Saint Croix, U.S. Virgin Islands